DC Rollergirls is a women's flat track roller derby league in Washington, D.C. DC Rollergirls is a member of the Women's Flat Track Derby Association (WFTDA).

History
DC Rollergirls was founded in early 2006 by Ginger Park, Shannon Flowers and Katelyn Coram. After spending much of the first year recruiting and training, the league first held public games in 2007 at the Dulles SportsPlex. By 2010, attendance for home games at the DC Armory was averaging between 1300 and 1500 fans.

In 2011, DC Rollergirls co-hosted the WFTDA Eastern Regional Tournament along with Baltimore league Charm City Rollergirls.

Before the DC Rollergirls, the area was home to the Washington, D.C. Jets, which played banked track roller derby until 1978.

The DC Rollergirls play most of their bouts at the DC Armory and Dulles SportsPlex; however, the league recently signed a lease on a warehouse located in Edmonston, Maryland. The warehouse will serve as a practice facility during but may also host bouts during future seasons.

Teams
As of the 2014–15 season, the league consists of four home teams: the Cherry Blossom Bombshells, DC DemonCats, Majority Whips and Scare Force One. Upon creation in 2006, the league consisted of the Cherry Blossom Bombshells, DC DemonCats, Scare Force One, and the now-defunct Secretaries of Hate. The Majority Whips was formed in 2011.

Seasons

WFTDA competition
DC Rollergirls' All-Star team competes on an international level. , they occupied 42nd place in the WFTDA's rankings. In 2009, DC competed at the WFTDA Eastern Regional Tournament as the ninth seed and finished in eighth place. At the 2010 Eastern Regional, DC was the tenth seed but finished in ninth place after defeating Dutchland Rollers 206–118. DC returned for the final Eastern Regional in 2012 as the tenth seed, but improved to a sixth-place finish, ending with a 252–112 loss to Montreal Roller Derby.

In 2013, DC qualified for the newly created Division 2 Playoffs as the fourth seed in Des Moines, Iowa, but finished in ninth place, salvaging their weekend with a 345–135 victory over Tallahassee RollerGirls. DC was the second seed at the 2014 Division 2 Playoff in Kitchener-Waterloo, Ontario, but finished in sixth place.

Rankings

External links
 DC Rollergirls Official website
 Washington Post video
 NPR feature

Notes and references

Non-profit organizations based in Washington, D.C.
Roller derby leagues established in 2006
Roller derby leagues in Washington, D.C.
2006 establishments in Washington, D.C.